Saad Jassim (4 August 1959 – 8 April 2019) was an Iraqi footballer. He played at the men's tournament at the 1980 Summer Olympics and 1982 Asian Games, winning the gold medal at the latter.

References

External links
 

1959 births
2019 deaths
Iraqi footballers
Iraq international footballers
Olympic footballers of Iraq
Footballers at the 1980 Summer Olympics
Place of birth missing
Association football midfielders
Asian Games medalists in football
Asian Games gold medalists for Iraq
Footballers at the 1982 Asian Games
Medalists at the 1982 Asian Games